Under the Renewable Energy Directive Ireland has set a target of producing 16% of all its energy needs from renewable energy sources by 2020. Between 2005 and 2014 the percentage of energy from renewable energy sources grew from just 3.1% to 8.6% of total final consumption. By 2020 the overall renewable energy share was 13.5%, short of its Renewable Energy Drive target of 16%. Renewable electricity accounted for 69% of all renewable energy used in 2020, up from two thirds (66.8%) in 2019.

The country has a large and growing installed wind power capacity at 4,405 MW by the end of 2021 producing 31% of all its electricity needs in that year. In contrast in 2020 it had the second lowest installation of solar PV power in the EU after Latvia at just 92.8 MW of installed capacity.

Energy consumption by sector 
According to the Irish National Renewable Energy Action Plan (NREAP), as submitted by all member states as part of the EU Renewable Energy Directive, in 2020 the gross final energy consumption in Ireland by sector is projected to break down as follows:

*All figures calculated as per Directive 2009/28/EC

In 2020 the transport sector is expected to comprise 42.6% of final energy consumption. The heating and cooling sector (also known as the thermal sector) includes domestic heating and air conditioning and industrial heat processes is expected to account for 36.6% of final energy consumption The electricity sector is projected to account for 20.9% of consumption.

Total annual energy consumption (after adjustments) is projected to be 14,142 ktoe (14.142  million tonnes of oil equivalent) by 2020. To meet Ireland's overall target of16% use of renewable energy in gross final energy consumption by 2020 (it was just 3.1% in 2005) targets have been set for each sector. By 2020 renewable energy use is targeted to be 12% in the heating and cooling sector, 42.5% in the electricity sector and 10% in the transport sector.

Sources

Wind power 

Wind power has been growing steadily in the Republic of Ireland by around 200 MW per year rising from 1,027 MW in 2008 to 4,351 MW by year end 2020. The grids of the Republic and Northern Ireland are integrated, and the combined wind power capacity is 5,030 MW. During the year 2020 wind power provided 36.3% of the country's electricity  On 5 February 2022 at 17:45, an all-time record was broken in Ireland, with wind generating 3,603 MW.

As of 2022 almost all wind power generation in Ireland is onshore. However, the Irish government plans to have 5 GW of offshore wind capacity built by 2030, with a goal of 35 GW by 2050.

Solar PV 

Solar PV installed capacity in Ireland is amongst the lowest in Europe, it was just over 2MW in 2015. In the same year the corresponding figure for the United Kingdom was 8,915 MW and for Denmark 790 MW. In 2015 the country had the lowest capacity per inhabitant of all EU countries, only Latvia had a lower absolute capacity. Predictions for future growth in installed capacity vary widely from 500 MW by 2021 to 3,700 MW by 2030 with government support.

Biomass

Solid biomass and biogas 

*Converted using IEA unit converter.

Solid biomass was used mostly in the heating and cooling sector providing 222 ktoe of energy, it was also used to generate some electricity at 28 ktoe of energy. Biogas was used mostly in the production of electricity contributing 18 ktoe.

Biofuels 

In 2014 Biodiesel provided 90 ktoe to the transport sector whilst Bioethanol/Bio-ETBE provided 27 ktoe.

Targets and Progress

Targets 

Overall renewable energy sources show a target trajectory of 6.6% share in 2010 rising to 14% by 2020. The electricity sector shows the most ambitious trajectory with a rise from 6.9% of total supply in 2005 to 42.5% by 2020.

Progress 

According to Ireland's third progress report, by 2014 the country had achieved an 8.6% share of overall energy use from renewable energy sources. This was below the targeted 11% share planned for that year.  Renewable energy use in the electricity sector was the furthest from its target of just over 8 percentage points below its target for the year.

In 2020 Ireland reached its renewable electricity target averaging at 40% renewable through the year (mostly from wind).  Heating and cooling and transport targets were not reached.

See also 
 Wind power in Ireland
 Energy in Ireland
 Electricity sector in Ireland
 Renewable energy in the UK
 Renewable energy in Scotland
 Renewable energy by country

References

External links 
 European Commission National Renewable Energy Action Plans
 European Commission renewable energy Progress Reports
 European Commission National Energy Efficiency Action Plans